is a guided bus station in Moriyama-ku, Nagoya, Aichi Prefecture, Japan.

Lines
Nagoya Guideway Bus
Yutorīto Line (Station number: Y08)

Adjacent stations

|-
!colspan=5|Nagoya Guideway Bus

Railway stations in Japan opened in 2001
Railway stations in Aichi Prefecture